Tapinoma emeryi is a species of ant in the genus Tapinoma. Described by Ashmead in 1905, the species is endemic to Tanzania and Philippines.

References

Tapinoma
Hymenoptera of Africa
Hymenoptera of Asia
Insects described in 1905